Kiltse KMK ("Loop of Kryvyi Rih Mettalurgical Combinate") is a station of the Kryvyi Rih Metrotram. The station was originally part of the city's larger tram system, although it was incorporated into the metrotram route along with four other stations on 25 May 2012. It is the terminus station on the metrotram's third route which begins at Zarichna.

The tram line reorganization was initiated in order to eliminate the need for transfer stops for the inhabitants traveling from Kryvyi Rih's northern neighborhoods to the southern end of town, near the ArcelorMittal Kryvyi Rih plant.

The Kiltse KMK station is located above ground, with platforms running on either side of the metrotram's tracks. A reversing loop is located directly behind the station to allow trams to change course and travel in the opposite direction.

References

External links
 

Kryvyi Rih Metrotram stations
Railway stations opened in 2012